The Chicago Union is a professional ultimate team that competes in the Central Division of the American Ultimate Disc League. The team was originally branded as the Windy City Wildfire. In their first year, the Wildfire had the best record in the then-Midwest Division and qualified for the playoffs in its first three seasons. They play home games at De La Salle Institute, in the South Side of Chicago.

History

Founding and inaugural season 
In March 2012, Steve Gordon purchased the territory rights based in Chicago as part of the first wave of expansion to begin play in the 2013 season. The Windy City Wildfire found a home field at Lane Tech College Prep. The inaugural season began in April 2013, and culminated with a 14–2 regular season record. The season ended with a first round playoff loss to the Madison Radicals.

2014–2016 
Going into the 2014 season, team ownership made the decision to legally change the name of the franchise to the Chicago Wildfire. The second season provided a strong 9–5 record and gave the team a second-place finish in the division. The team ended the season with a first round playoff loss to the New York Empire.

In 2015, the organization decided to shift 5 of their 7 home games to Benedictine University, which is located in Lisle, Illinois. The season yielded an 8–5–1 record, allowing for a third-place finish in the division, and a postseason appearance against the Pittsburgh Thunderbirds. The post season was short lived, as the Chicago Wildfire fell to the Thunderbirds, ending their 2015 season.

For the 2016 season, all home games were moved back to the original home field of Lane Tech College Prep. The Wildfire fell to a record of 4–10 which tied them for 5th in the division with the Detroit Mechanix, and did not make the playoffs.

2017 season 
On January 1, 2017, Steve Gordon signed on Trent Kuhl as General Manager of the Chicago Wildfire. Former player and Assistant Coach Adrian King was named Head Coach, while Andrew "AJ" Nelson joined the coaching ranks as Assistant Coach. Returner Jack Shey and first time player Pawel Janas were elected as captains for the 2017 season. The Wildfire finished 3–11, but the future looked bright for the young core of talent on the team.

2018 season 
For the 2018 season, Adrian King returned as head coach. The team improved with a 5–9 record for the season.

2019 season 
In 2019, former player, Dave Woods, took the reins from Adrian King and became the head coach of the Chicago Wildfire. Pawel Janas had a record breaking season for assists. The Wildfire finished at 7–5 and earned their first playoff bid since 2015. Unfortunately, the team fell to Pittsburgh losing 21–20, ending their season.

The offseason allowed the Chicago Wildfire to take the big stage against the Indianapolis Alley Cats. The two teams battled at Soldier Field during the Chicago Bears halftime show. Over 60,000 fans got to witness an AUDL game as the Wildfire defeated the Alley Cats in the exhibition.

2020 season 
The 2020 season was expected to be a solid year for the Chicago Wildfire. However, weeks before the season was set to start, the league canceled the season due to the COVID-19 pandemic affecting the world. The Chicago Wildfire decided to retire the name and create an opportunity for a rebranding moment. After receiving many options from fans, the new era for Chicago professional ultimate will be represented by the Chicago Union.

2021 season 
In 2021, the Chicago Union finished first in the Central Division with a 10-2 record. In the first round of the playoffs the Union won their first playoff game, defeating Dallas 22-18. Unfortunately they lost to New York in the semifinals 22-18.

2022 season 
In 2022, The Union finished first in the central division with a 13-2 record. They made it to the Championship but ultimately lost to the New York Empire. Kyle Rutledge was AUDL First Team All-Rookie. Pawel Janas was selected to the First Team All-AUDL.

References

External links
 

Ultimate (sport) teams
Union
Ultimate teams established in 2013
2013 establishments in Illinois